Eustace Akwei (3 December 1913 – ?) was a Ghanaian medical doctor and politician. He was the first Ghanaian to be appointed Chief Medical Officer in the Gold Coast.

Early life 
Akwei was born on 3 December 1913. He was educated at Achimota School in Accra and at Edinburgh University.

Professional career
Eustace Akwei worked as a public health physician in the Gold Coast. He was the first native to work with Dr G. T. Saunders, who was the first specialist epidemiologist and was instrumental in the control of trypanosomiasis in the country. He was a former Rockefeller Travelling Fellow and later became the first Ghanaian to be appointed Chief Medical Officer to the Ministry of Health in the Gold Coast in 1955. He was one of the prominent doctors present at the inauguration of the Ghana Medical Association in 1958. He was removed from his chief medic role in 1959 by Kwame Nkrumah, who was at the time the Prime Minister of Ghana. He subsequently joined the World Health Organization and was based in Brazzaville in the Republic of the Congo. After the coup d'état in 1966, he was reappointed Chief Medical Officer by the new National Liberation Council (NLC) military government which replaced the ruling Nkrumah government.

Politics
In 1966, Akwei was appointed Commissioner for Health by the NLC military government, a position he held until the return of democratic rule in 1969.

References

See also
Minister for Health
National Liberation Council

Health ministers of Ghana
Ghanaian public health doctors
Year of death missing
1913 births
Alumni of Achimota School
Alumni of the University of Edinburgh